The Naqada culture is an archaeological culture of Chalcolithic Predynastic Egypt (c. 4000–3000 BC), named for the town of Naqada, Qena Governorate. A 2013 Oxford University radiocarbon dating study of the Predynastic period suggests a beginning date sometime between 3,800 and 3,700 BC.

The final phase of the Naqada culture is Naqada III, which is coterminous with the Protodynastic Period (Early Bronze Age ) in ancient Egypt.

Chronology

William Flinders Petrie
The Naqada period was first divided by the British Egyptologist William Matthew Flinders Petrie, who explored the site in 1894, into three sub-periods:
Naqada I: Amratian (after the cemetery near El-Amrah, Egypt)
Naqada II: Gerzean (after the cemetery near Gerzeh)
Naqada III: Semainean (after the cemetery near Es-Semaina)

Werner Kaiser

Petrie's chronology was superseded by that of Werner Kaiser in 1957. Kaiser's chronology began c. 4000 BC, but the modern version has been adjusted slightly, as follows:
Naqada I (about 3900–3650 BC)
black-topped and painted pottery
trade with Nubia, Western Desert oases, and Eastern Mediterranean
obsidian from Ethiopia
Naqada II (about 3650–3300 BC)
represented throughout Egypt
first marl pottery, and metalworking
Naqada III (about 3300–2900 BC)
more elaborate grave goods, first Pharaohs
cylindrical jars
writing

Monuments and excavations 
The Material culture at Naqada sites vary depeding on the phase of Naqada Culture. The excavation of pottery at most Naqada sites with each distinct periods of culture having their own defining pottery. The types of pottery that were found at Naqada sites arranged from bowls, small jars, bottles, Medium-sized neck jars to Wine Jars and Wavy-handled jars. Most of the pottery excavated from Naqada sites have probably been used for cultural reasons with the decorations on them and for storage of food as well as placing food on it for consumption(the food). The various designs that are included in pottery are designs with waves on them and are sometimes accompanied with floral designs or designs of people on them suggesting that art was heavily expressed during the Naqada Cultures. The various designs might have also had early Mesopotamian influence as some animals that are depicted on pottery during the Naqada II period show animals like Griffins and serpent-headed panthers which are linked to early Uruk period pottery. The presence of copper metallurgy has been found at various Naqada III sites such as Tel El-Farkha and Tel El-Murra has evidence that copper harpoons had been manufactured in these sites. The use of Copper Harpoons in Naqada society were primarily used for hunting as it was used to hunt Nile Fauna such as the Hippopotamus. The importance of hunting the Hippopotamus is noted to be important among Naqada high class as it was regarded as high social status although the access of copper was more open to the elites rather then the common folk. Harpoons themselves were likely used for protection of trade as evident from an Ancient Egyptian port that signaled that it was used by people of trade caravans as protection. Another use of the Harpoon was in Art as the symbolism of the Harpoon was probably used in religious purposes as possibly referencing a magic-like hunt using these weapons.

  The small figurines that are found at Naqada type sites are usually made out of materials such as stones and Ivory. The figurines that re found Naqada sites may have been made for everyday use such as children toys. It more theorized that the figurines were used for ritualistic purpose such as for medicine and magic. The figurines may have also played more into religion as speculated that some figurines were made to be worshiped as Fertile idols and helping with the production of farming and crop use. The small figurines may have also been used in mortuary and burial rituals as excavated figurines at Naqada sites have been found close to bodies, suggesting that figurines may have been used in these rituals.Knife and knife handles were common during Naqada Culture. There seem to be a distinct tradition of Knife that being the Twisted knife tradition which started in Northern/Lower Egypt and made it's way into upper Egypt combining a tradition of Northern and Southern Tradition in Knifes. The Knife's that were found during this period appeared to be made out of Flint. Knife handles that are dated back to the Naqada II period show intricate work on knife handles as designs of humans worshiping and scenes from the Nature of Egypt are shown on these knife handles. Due to the artwork on some of the Knife handles it can be inferred that Knifes with designed handles on them were reserved for the upper elites of Society.

Early forms of Egyptian writing appear in the Naqada culture. Writing itself appears around the Naqada II period and the forms that it took were in the forms of pictograms. There are several artifacts that depict writing on them. Mostly these are found on vessels and the writing usually depicts animals and people and was used to document trade and administrative transactions. With writing being central around the Elites, early writing was used more for documentation of royalty more then everyday life in Naqada Culture as seen in Early Dynastic and Predynastic Egypt.Multiple buildings were present at Naqada sites. The site at Tel-El Farkha, located 14 km east from El-Simbillawein in Egypt, shows evidence of breweries is found dating back from the Naqada II site. The Breweries themselves were surrounded by wooden fences that would've separated ordinary houses from. The wooden fences themselves overtime were replaced by mud brick walls as evident the excavation at Tel-El Farkha. The Brewery located at Tel-EL Farkha has 13 consecutive vats in the building which was probably used for the production of beer. The Beer was usually made in two ways of making part of the grain malted and the other part into Porridge. Then it would be mixed and the liquid would be removed from the mixture via sieving the liquid. This resulted in Beer. Also at the Tel-El Farkha sites is evidence of buildings one of the biggest in the site was built on top of a mound and is surrounded by thick mud brick walls and inside the building is small poorly preserved rooms that were surrounded by 30–40 cm walls. The walls that are made around the structure were probably made for defensive reasons. There have also been jars found in this specific building suggesting that the building was also used as a warehouse.

Predynastic Egyptians in the Naqada I period traded with Nubia to the south, the oases of the western desert to the west, and the cultures of the eastern Mediterranean to the east. Trade was most likely conducted by the elites of society. People of the Naqada culture traded with cultures in Lower Nubia most likely the A-culture group. Material evidence that's found of the trade between the Naqada cultures and Nubians is found in the artifacts that are at these sites. Items that are often traded between the two include pottery, clothing, palettes, and stone vessels were most likely exchanged between Nubians and Egyptians. The pottery that was found in Nubia was mostly found in grave sites usually around bodies. Pottery itself was also traded from the Levant as one piece of pottery from the Tel-El Farkha site was found to have been made out of clay that isn't present in the region suggesting that it was made and traded from the Levant. They also imported obsidian from Ethiopia to shape blades and other objects from flakes. Charcoal samples found in the tombs of Nekhen, which were dated to the Naqada I and II periods, have been identified as cedar from Lebanon.

Biological anthropological studies 
Some craniometric analysis of predynastic Naqada human remains found that they were closely related to other Afroasiatic-speaking populations inhabiting the Horn of Africa and the Maghreb, as well as to Bronze Age and medieval period Nubians and to specimens from ancient Jericho. The Naqada skeletons were also morphologically proximate to modern osteological series from Europe and the Indian subcontinent. However, the Naqada skeletons and these ancient and recent skeletons were phenotypically distinct from skeletons belonging to modern Niger-Congo-speaking populations inhabiting Tropical Africa, as well as from Mesolithic skeletons excavated at Wadi Halfa in the Nile Valley. The 1993 craniofacial study performed by Brace et al reached the view that "The Predynastic of Upper Egypt and the Late Dynastic of Lower Egypt are more closely related to each other than to any other population" and most similar to modern Egyptians among modern populations, stating that "the Egyptians have been in place since back in the Pleistocene and have been largely unaffected by either invasions or migrations." In 2022, the methodology of the Brace study was criticised by biological anthropologist S.O.Y. Keita for “misstating the underlying assumptions of canonical variates and principal component analysis used in others’ work”. Also, Keita noted that the 1993 study overlooked “the fact that even in their study Egyptians could be found clustering with ancient Nubians and modern  Somali, both tropical African groups”.

Hanihara et al. (2003) performed a cranial study on 70 samples from a global database which featured samples from Predynastic Naqada and 12th-13th dynasty Kerma which were classified in the study as "North Africans" and other samples from Somalia along with Nigeria which were classified as "Sub-Saharans" but lacked a specified dating period. The samples from predynastic Naqada and Kerma clustered closely whilst the other samples from Sub-Saharan Africa showed "significant separation from other regions, as well as diversity among themselves".

Various biological anthropological studies have found Naqada skeletal remains to have African biological affinities. Biological anthropologists, Shomarka Keita and A.J. Boyce, have stated that the "studies of crania from southern predynastic Egypt, from the formative period (4000-3100 B.C.), show them usually to be more similar to the crania of ancient Nubians, Kushites, Saharans, or modern groups from the Horn of Africa than to those of dynastic northern Egyptians or ancient or modern southern Europeans". Keita and Boyce further added that the limb proportions of early Nile Valley remains were generally closer to tropical populations. They regarded this as significant because Egypt is not located in the tropical region. The authors suggested that “the Egyptian Nile Valley was not primarily settled by cold-adapted peoples such as Europeans”.

In 1996, Lovell and Prowse reported the presence of individuals buried at Naqada in what they interpreted to be elite, high-status tombs, showing them to be an endogamous ruling or elite segment who were significantly different from individuals buried in two other, apparently nonelite cemeteries, and more closely related morphologically to populations in Northern Nubia than to neighbouring populations at Badari and Qena in southern Egypt. Specifically, the authors stated that the Naqada samples were "more similar to the Lower Nubian protodynastic sample than they are to the geographically more proximate Egyptian samples" in Qena and Badari. Although, the samples from Naqada, Badari and Qena were all found to be significantly different from each other and from the protodynastic populations in northern Nubia. Overall, both the elite and nonelite individuals at the Naqada cemeteries were more similar to each other than they were to the samples in northern Nubia or to other predynastic samples in southern Egypt.

In 1999, Lovell summarised the findings of modern skeletal studies which had determined that "in general, the inhabitants of Upper Egypt and Nubia had the greatest biological affinity to people of the Sahara and more southerly areas" but exhibited local variation in an African context. She also wrote that the archaeological and inscriptional evidence for contact between Egypt and Syro-Palestine "suggests that gene flow between these areas was very likely".

In 2018, Godde assessed population relationships in the Nile Valley by comparing crania from 18 Egyptian and Nubian groups, spanning from Lower Egypt to Lower Nubia across 7,400 years. Overall, the results showed that the Mesolithic Nubian sample had a greater similarity with Naqada Egyptians. Similarly, Lower Nubian and Upper Egyptian samples clustered together. However, the Lower Egyptian samples formed a homogeneous unit, and there was a north-south gradient in the data set. In 2020, Godde analysed a series of crania, including two Egyptian (predynastic Badarian and Nagada series), a series of A-Group Nubians and a Bronze Age series from Lachish, Palestine. The two pre-dynastic series had strongest affinities, followed by closeness between the Nagada and the Nubian series. Further, the Nubian A-Group plotted nearer to the Egyptians and the Lachish sample placed more closely to Naqada than Badari. According to Godde the spatial-temporal model applied to the pattern of biological distances explains the more distant relationship of Badari to Lachish than Naqada to Lachish as gene flow will cause populations to become more similar over time. Overall, both Egyptian samples were more similar to the Nubian series than to the Lachish series.

In 2023, Christopher Ehret reported that the physical anthropological findings from the “major burial sites of those founding locales of ancient Egypt in the fourth millennium BCE, notably El-Badari as well as Naqada, show no demographic indebtedness to the Levant”. Ehret specified that these studies revealed cranial and dental affinities with "closest parallels" to other longtime populations in the surrounding areas of northeastern Africa “such as Nubia and the northern Horn of Africa”. He further commented that the Naqada and Badarian populations did not migrate “from somewhere else but were descendants of the long-term inhabitants of these portions of Africa going back many millennia”.

Genetic data on the Naqada remains

Keita and Boyce (1996) noted that DNA studies had not been conducted on the southern predynastic Egyptian skeletons. Although, various DNA studies have found Christian-era and modern Nubians along with modern Afro-Asiatic speaking populations in the Horn of Africa to be descended from a mix of West Eurasian and African populations. Several scholars have highlighted a number of methodological limitations with the application of DNA studies to Egyptian mummified remains.

Relative chronology

References

 
Predynastic Egypt
Chalcolithic cultures of Africa
5th-millennium BC establishments
3rd-millennium BC disestablishments in Egypt
Archaeological cultures in Egypt